Fischberg Castle (Burgruine Fischberg) was a high medieval fortification in the Felda valley that was sited on an exposed hill above the villages of Klings, Fischbach and Diedorf. Its ruins currently stand in the county of Wartburgkreis (Thuringia) -  in the Anterior Rhön, part of a mountain region in central Germany.

Location 
The parish boundary between these two villages runs over the castle hill. The western part of the castle site has almost been destroyed by the adjacent rock quarry.

Description 
The medieval site was relatively small and, according to the findings from excavations, comprised a bergfried, a main house and a secondary building as well as an enceinte. The castle used the existing banks and ditches of an earlier fortification. The gateway was probably in the south where, even today, a farm track runs up the hill. On the western slopes of the castle hill was a well, by the mule track, that was used by the castle inhabitants.

References

Literature

External links 

Rhön Mountains
Castles in Thuringia
Buildings and structures in Wartburgkreis
Buildings and structures in Schmalkalden-Meiningen